The 2012 Superliga Colombiana was the first edition of the Superliga Colombiana. Atlético Nacional was the winner of the tournament.

Teams

Matches

First leg

Second leg

External links
Superliga Postobon
Superliga, Dimayor.com
Regulations

References

Superliga Colombiana
Superliga Colombiana 2012
Superliga Colombiana